ABV is the name of the Australian Broadcasting Corporation's television station in Melbourne, Victoria.

History
The station began broadcasting on 19 November 1956 and is transmitted throughout the state via a network of relay transmitters. ABV  was the second television station founded in Victoria after the first, HSV-7, which opened two weeks earlier on 4 November, as well as being the third television station to launch in Australia overall (the first being TCN-9). The studios are located in Southbank (although formerly in Elsternwick) with the transmitter at Mount Dandenong.

The analogue television signal for Melbourne was shut off on 10 December 2013, the last city in a phased shutdown as part of the conversion to digital television in Australia.

Programming

Local programming
ABV follows a schedule nearly identical to that of other statewide ABC Television stations, allowing for time differences and some local programming – including news, current affairs, sport join and state election coverage.

ABC News Victoria is presented by Tamara Oudyn from Sunday to Thursday and Mary Gearin on Friday and Saturday. The weeknight bulletins also incorporate weather forecasts presented by Paul Higgins as well as a national finance segment presented by Alan Kohler.

Suzie Raines, Ben Knight, Bridget Rollason and Paul Higgins (news) and Nate Byrne, Danny Tran and Annie Kearney (weather) are fill in presenters for the bulletin.

ABV also carried live coverage of Victorian Football League matches on Saturday afternoons during the season until 2015 and the finals of the TAC Cup.

Former sports presenter Angela Pippos resigned in October 2007 after being demoted as weeknight sports presenter to weekend presenter in 2004 to make way for Peter Wilkins. It was documented in the press that Pippos had some run-ins with senior management over this issue and the timing of her departure, which came after she was approached by Victorian premier John Brumby to run as a candidate in the Williamstown by-election, caused by the resignation of former premier Steve Bracks. Pippos was suspended for one week while she made her decision not to stand, but resigned just weeks later. 
In 2008, ABC News Victoria won one week in the 2008 television ratings season, and tied in another week with Seven News Melbourne.

Networked programming from ABV

News/Current Affairs
ABC News Victoria
ABC News at Five
ABC News at Eleven (via ABC News Channel)
Afternoon Briefing (via ABC News Channel)
News Breakfast (Recorded from Southbank studios on weekdays only)
The World (via ABC News Channel)
The World This Week (via ABC News Channel)
Insiders
Offsiders
News on 3 (via ABC Me)

Drama
Sleuth 101
East of Everything
Miss Fisher's Murder Mysteries
The Doctor Blake Mysteries

Entertainment
The Weekly with Charlie Pickering (2015–present)
Spicks and Specks (2005–2011, 2014)
Gardening Australia
Beached Az
Rage
Shaun Micallef's Mad as Hell

Past programming

Dirty Laundry Live (2013–2016)
7.30 Victoria
Newsline with Jim Middleton (via Australia Network)
VFL
The Slap (Australian TV series)
Adam Hills In Gordon Street Tonight (2011–2013)
Studio 3 (via ABC Me) (2009–2016)
The Librarians
Prank Patrol (via ABC Me) (2009–2013)
The Marngrook Footy Show (2011–2012)
Bed of Roses (2008–2011)
Stateline (1995–2010) Replaced by 7.30 Victoria
Summer Heights High (2008)
We Can Be Heroes: Finding The Australian of the Year (2005)
George Negus Tonight (2002–2004)
Kath & Kim (2002–2004) Production moved to HSV7
Something in the Air (TV series) (2000–2002)
The 10:30 Slot (1999–2000)
The Micallef P(r)ogram(me) (1998–2001)
Sea Change (1998–2000)
Recovery (1996–2000)
The Adventures of Lano and Woodley (1997–1999)
Frontline (1994–1997)
Round the Twist (1989–2001)
The D-Generation (1986–1988)
Just Barbara (1962)

History
Past programming produced at ABV-2 included Corinne Kerby's Let's Make a Date, the popular children's fantasy Adventure Island, the multi-award-winning miniseries Power Without Glory, entertainment show The Big Gig and the iconic youth music program Countdown.

Early efforts by the station included Variety View (1958–1959), Melbourne Magazine (1957), Sweet and Low (1959) and Melody Time (1957–1959).

The first dramatic production by the station was a live, 30-minute play called Roundabout which aired on 4 January 1957.

ABV Channel 2 moved to new studios at Ripponlea in 1958, in Gordon Street, Elsternwick, with two major studios: Studio 31 & 32. The land had been acquired from the adjacent Rippon Lea Estate. Over the years, many additional properties were leased. The ABC began consolidating all their Melbourne operations in 1999, with purchase of a property behind their Southbank premises which had housed their radio operations since 1994. The television news moved to Southbank in 2000, and the government approved a loan in 2013 to move the studio production. The facility was finished in 2017 and the final show to be filmed at Ripponlea was Shaun Micallef's Mad as Hell in November 2017, with all production consolidated into a single Studio 31 at Southbank after that.

Relay stations
The following stations relay ABV throughout Victoria:

Notes:
1. HAAT estimated from http://www.itu.int/SRTM3/ using EHAAT.
2. ABGV was on VHF channel 3 from its 1963 sign-on until 1991, moving to its current channel in order to accommodate FM radio.
3. ABLV was on VHF channel 4 from its 1963 sign-on until 1991, moving to its current channel in order to accommodate FM radio.
4. ABMV was on VHF channel 4 from its 1965 sign-on until sometime in the 1990s, moving to its current channel in order to accommodate FM radio.
5. ABRV was on VHF channel 3 from its 1963 sign-on until sometime around 1991, moving to VHF channel 11 in order to accommodate FM radio. It moved to its current channel on 22 January 2001 in order to accommodate digital television in Melbourne.
6. ABMV was on VHF channel 6 until 30 June 2010 due to the Analogue switchoff in the Mildura/Sunraysia region
7. Analogue transmissions ceased as of 5 May 2011 as part of the conversion to digital television.

See also
Television broadcasting in Australia

References

External links
ABV-2 historical info
Corrine Kerby & Oscar Whitbread behind the scenes.  State Library of Victoria (SLV).
Clive Winmill Compere of ABV-2's Children's Hour picture at SLV.

Television stations in Melbourne
Television channels and stations established in 1956
Australian Broadcasting Corporation television stations